The Izhevsk State Medical Academy (ISMA; , ИГМА) is a public higher medical school in Izhevsk, Russia. The academy is an institution of Russia in medicine and training specialists in preventive and clinical medicine.

History 
After the October Revolution and the Russian Civil War, because of outbreaks of anthrax and cholera in the Ural and Volga Regions, there was the urgent need in medical staff. In 1933, due the Resolution of the Soviets the Izhevsk State Medical Institute was esteblished. The medical scientist  was one of its founders.

In August 1933, 171 students were enrolled in the first year of the General Medicine Department of the institute. In 1938, the first graduation of doctors took place, and most of them were sent to work in medical organisations of Udmurtia. In the years of the Great Patriotic War, the most of graduate doctors were sent to the frontline and rear hospitals.

After the war, the Paediatrics Department (1975) and the Dentistry Department (1980) were opened at the institute.

Education 
In the academy the education process is organized at four departments:
 General Medicine Department,
 Paediatrics Department,
 Dentistry Department,
 Department of Post-graduate and Professional Training.

In addition, there is a Center for pre-university and additional education.

Students are trained in the specialties "medical care", "pediatrics" and "dentistry". Post-graduate and professional training is carried out in internship, residency and Ph.D. degree studies.

Since 2008, the academy has been publishing a journal in Russian and English languages "Health, Demography, Ecology of Finno-Ugric People" ( — ).

References

Citations

Bibliography 
 Ижевская медицинская академия государственная // Удмуртская Республика : Энциклопедия [Udmurt Republic : Encyclopedia] / гл. ред. В. В. Туганаев. — 2-е изд., испр. и доп. — Ижевск : Издательство «Удмуртия», 2008. — С. 352. — 768 с. — 2200 экз. — ISBN 978-5-7659-0486-2

External links 
  

Universities in Volga Region
Izhevsk
Izhevsk
Buildings and structures in Udmurtia
Medical schools in Russia